Pierre Castex (1924–1991) was a French screenwriter.

External links

1924 births
1991 deaths
French male screenwriters
20th-century French screenwriters
20th-century French male writers